Stafford Springs may refer to:

Stafford Springs, Connecticut, a community in Stafford, Connecticut
Stafford Springs, Mississippi
Stafford Mineral Springs